York Festival of Ideas is a cultural festival in York, England, that aims to "educate, entertain and inspire". It runs for two weeks in June each year, in venues across the city centre and at the University of York. 

The festival was launched in 2011 as a partnership between the University of York and major cultural organisations in the city including York Theatre Royal, York Museums Trust, the National Centre for Early Music and the Joseph Rowntree Foundation to celebrate York's reputation as a city of ideas and innovation, and to demonstrate the transformative power of education and ideas. 

York Festival of Ideas celebrates the vibrancy of the city of York with a range of speakers, exhibitions, performances and a host of interactive experiences for people of all ages, including York residents and visitors to the city.  On average the Festival attracts over fifteen thousand people each year.

Festivals

2011

The 2011 pilot festival consisted of over 20 events across the city of York.  The themes for the first Festival were Beckett, the Body and the Bible.  The Festival included events with two novelists powerfully influenced by Beckett's work - John Banville and the Nobel Laureate JM Coetzee, in addition to theatre performances by the internationally renowned Gare St Lazare Players.  The Festival of Ideas in 2011 was a partnership between the University of York, York Theatre Royal, The National Centre for Early Music and York Museums Trust.

2012

The overarching theme for the 2012 Festival was Metamorphoses,  which included major topic areas such as the perils and perceptions of ageing; how conflict transforms lives; architecture as a catalyst for social, cultural and economic progress, and the turbulence of financial markets.  The programme also included a Science out of the Lab event in the city centre; a New Writers’ Day; a variety of exhibitions, musical performances and concerts, and international speakers such as Anthony Horowitz and Jung Chang.

2013

York Festival of Ideas 2013 was organised around the theme North and South.  Celebrating York's status as 'capital of the North', the Festival explored, questioned and celebrated ideas of 'North', both as a stand-alone idea, and in direct comparison with ideas of 'South'. Festival events explored ideas of cultural identity, health, food, women, technology and architecture.

The programme provided a wide variety of events including debates as part of BBC Radio 3's Free Thinking Festival; a New Writers’ day with Granta Magazine's Best of Young British Novelists List; Festival Focus days on architecture and design and the economy; a variety of exhibitions, musical performances from national and international performers, hands-on activities and workshops,  and headline addresses by speakers such as Melvyn Bragg, Heidi Thomas, Brian Sewell,  William Sitwell, Michael Wood, Ross Noble, Michael Scott, Zoe Williams, Harriet Sergeant and Seamus Heaney, in what was one of his last public appearances before his death.

In addition, the University of York and the York Festival of Ideas hosted the prestigious Royal Academy of Engineering Summer Soiree Exhibition on 27 June attended by the Princess Royal, in her capacity as Patron of the Royal Academy of Engineering.  This included a major exhibition entitled, Engineering: Design for Living, which showcased research across a range of disciplines from literature and advances in computer science, to the emergence of 'personalised' medicine, to demonstrate the way in which engineering ingenuity has and is influencing and improving the way in which we live our lives.

The 2013 York Festival of Ideas included more than 120 events, with 35 organisations co-delivering events under the Festival of Ideas banner. These included the British Library, BBC Radio 3, Granta Magazine, The Institute of Engineering and Technology, The Joseph Rowntree Foundation, York Museums Trust, Bettys and Taylors of Harrogate, and York Minster, to name but a few.

York Festival of Ideas was shortlisted for the Times Higher Education Awards 2013.

2014

The 2014 Festival theme Order and Chaos provided a rich and stimulating array of subjects including arts and society, conflict and resolution, the future of food, maps and exploration, healthcare, science and religion, economic growth, the ancient world and the mysteries of our brain.

The programme provided a wide variety of events including panel debates on the world's response to global crises, and on detective writing; Festival Focus days on economic growth, religion and science, the future of food, and detective writing; a variety of exhibitions, musical and theatrical performances from national and international performers, hands-on activities and workshops, and headline addresses by speakers such as Jung Chang, Michael Morpurgo, Anthony Horowitz, Charlie Higson, Hermione Lee, James Rubin, and Gavin Esler.

The 2014 York Festival of Ideas consisted of over 140 events. More than 45 organisations co-delivered events under the Festival of Ideas banner in 38 venues around the city.  These included the British Library, Castle Howard, Prospect magazine, The Institute of Engineering and Technology, The Joseph Rowntree Foundation, York Museums Trust, Bettys and Taylors of Harrogate, Chatham House, Tate Britain, and York Minster, to name but a few.

2015

More than 150 events were delivered under the 2015 Festival theme Secrets and Discoveries between 9 and 21 June. 45 organisations  co-delivered events under the Festival of Ideas banner in 50 venues. These included Waterstones, Joseph Rowntree Society, Bettys, York Minster, National Railway Museum, York Museums Trust and National Centre for Early Music. The events encompassed art and design, the economy and equality, food and health, performance and poetry, the past and the future, security and surveillance, truth and trust, technology and the environment, and much more. Headline speakers included Michael Morpurgo, Sir Christopher Frayling, Claire Wilcox, Andrew Davies, Richard Davies, Polly Toynbee, and Peter Murray. Festival Focus days focused on the sub-themes of Curiouser and Curiouser, The Future of Food, The Future of Democracy and Economic Growth, and Surveillance, Snowden and Security.

2016

The 2016 York Festival of Ideas, with the theme of Tick Tock, contained more than 180 events involving inspirational speakers, performers and exhibitions, such as Sara Pascoe, Owen Jones, Zoe Williams, John Kay, Stephanie Flanders, Ruth Davies, Lynsey Hanley, Alan Travis, Princess Vittoria Alliata, Rear Admiral Chris Parry, Lyse Doucet, and Baroness McIntosh.  Festival partners included Classic FM, BBC History Magazine, Joseph Rowntree Foundation, Quorn Foods, Aviva, and Shepherd Group. Subjects explored included living with floods, the future of food, equality, Europe, minds and bodies, and fragile states.

York Festival of Ideas was a finalist in the York Cultural Awards 2016.

2017

The 2017 York Festival of Ideas took place from 6 to 18 June with the theme The Story of Things.

2018

The 2018 York Festival of Ideas took place from 5 to 17 June under the overarching banner of Imagining the Impossible.

2019

The 2019 York Festival of Ideas took place from 4 to 16 June under the banner of A World of Wonder.

2020

York Festival of Ideas for 2020 was due to be held from 2-14 June 2020.
On 19 March, the Festival was postponed due to the COVID-19 pandemic.

As a result of the COVID-19 pandemic in the United Kingdom, the festival was relaunched as the York Festival of Ideas 2020 online running instead from 2 to 14 June 2020 under the banner of Virtual Horizons.

2021

York Festival of Ideas is scheduled to be held from 8 to 20 June 2021 under the banner of Infinite Horizons.

References

Festivals in York
Culture in York